Lucerito is the fifth album from Mexican pop music singer and actress Lucerito, also it is known by the name Ocho Quince (Eng. Eight fifteen). It was released in 1988, presenting two covers, one of The Dixie Cups' Chapel of Love of the original cover in Spanish of 1965 of Mayté Gaos for the song Vete con Ella and Carole King's You've Got a Friend for Tu Amiga Fiel. It was her first album presented in a digital format.

Track listing
The album is composed by ten songs.

Singles

Sales
"Lucerito" sold 400,000 copies earning Gold Disc, which 250,000 were sold in Mexico. In 5 months some singles are released: "Millones mejor que tú", "No me hablen de él" and "Tu amiga fiel". She recorded two videos to promote the album, "Vete con ella" and "Millones mejor que tú", they peaked the Top 10 on the program of Gloria Calzada called "8O's Stars". The album achieved high sales in Costa Rica, Chile, Colombia, Venezuela, Guatemala, U.S.A., which Lucero visited to promote her album.

References

1988 albums
Lucero (entertainer) albums